Blue Spoon is an album by blues vocalist Jimmy Witherspoon which was recorded in 1964 and released on the Prestige label.

Reception

Richie Unterberger, in his review for Allmusic, says "Blue Spoon was one of Witherspoon's jazzier sessions, still retaining his characteristic jazz-blues blend, but lighter on the soul, pop, and shouting R&B elements of some of his other releases".

Track listing 
All compositions by Jimmy Witherspoon except where noted.
 "I Wonder" (Cecil Gant, Raymond Leveen) – 2:19     
 "It's Only a Low Down Dirty Shame" (Ollie Shepard) – 2:25     
 "Nobody Knows You When You're Down and Out" (Jimmy Cox) – 2:19     
 "Back to New Orleans" (Brownie McGhee, Sonny Terry) – 1:47     
 "It's All in the Game" (Charles Dawes, Carl Sigman) – 2:54     
 "Blues in the Morning" (Kenny Burrell) – 5:08     
 "I'll Never Be Free" (Bennie Benjamin, George Weiss) – 4:11
 "Once There Lived a Fool" (Jessie Mae Robinson) – 2:32
 "For Old Time's Sake" – 2:15     
 "The Time Has Come" – 2:46

Personnel 
Jimmy Witherspoon – vocals
Gildo Mahones – piano
Kenny Burrell – guitar
Eddie Khan – bass
Roy Haynes – drums

References 

Jimmy Witherspoon albums
1964 albums
Prestige Records albums
Albums recorded at Van Gelder Studio
Albums produced by Ozzie Cadena